The San Salvador River (Uruguay) is a river of Uruguay.

See also
List of rivers of Uruguay

References
Rand McNally, The New International Atlas, 1993.
 GEOnet Names Server

Rivers of Uruguay
Tributaries of the Uruguay River
Rivers of Soriano Department